Almost Christmas may refer to:

 Almost Christmas (film), a 2016 American film
 Almost Christmas, a working title for the 2013 American film All Is Bright